Francesco Yates (born September 11, 1995) is a Canadian singer and songwriter.

Biography 
Yates was born in Toronto and started writing music at the age of 11. He signed to Atlantic Records when he was 16. His self-titled debut EP, released on September 11, 2015, was co-produced by Robin Hannibal and Pharrell Williams.

In 2015, Yates received the Heatseeker Award at the Canadian Radio Music Awards and performed at the official Canada Day celebration in Ottawa. He provides the vocals on the Robin Schulz song "Sugar". He also performed at We Days across Canada that same year. In 2016, he was an opening act for Canadian pop rock band Hedley on their Hello World Tour with Carly Rae Jepsen.

On February 2, 2018, his single "Come Over", was released, alongside the announcement that Francesco was going to be the opening act on the Canadian leg of Justin Timberlake's Man Of The Woods Tour. His next song, "Do You Think About Me", was released on April 6. This is the first song which Francesco wrote, produced and performed entirely by himself. He released his single "Somebody Like You", on July 20.

In the end of August it was announced that he was opening for Justin Timberlake again on the remaining North American part of his tour. The tour ended on April 13, 2019, after being postponed due to Timberlake suffering from bruised vocal cords.

On December 27, 2019, Francesco officially released his single "I Got You", having previously uploaded it on SoundCloud in the beginning of the year.

On April 10, 2020, Francesco released his single "Superbad" along with an official video. On May 29, 2020, he released a second single called "Bad Decisions". On June 26, 2020, Francesco released his second EP "Superbad". It features the two previously released singles, as well as the songs "Angel", "Dirty Little Secrets" and "Queen St. Blues". The EP is accompanied by a short film, which contains parts of the songs.

On September 18, 2020, his single "Late Night Love" was released. On February 14, 2021, Valentine's Day, Francesco released his song "Dive".

After performing it on an episode of The Recording Academy's "Press Play at Home" series, on June 10, 2022 he released his single "Jimi", which is inspired by the famous guitarist, singer and songwriter Jimi Hendrix. In July he announced on Instagram that he's opening for Backstreet Boys on the American and Canadian leg of their DNA Tour.

Discography

Extended plays

Singles

As featured artist

References

External links

 Official website

Living people
1995 births
Musicians from Toronto
Canadian contemporary R&B singers
Canadian soul singers
Canadian pop singers
21st-century Canadian male singers
Atlantic Records artists